Lee County Airport , also known as Butters Field, is a public use airport in Lee County, South Carolina, United States. This airport is included in the National Plan of Integrated Airport Systems for 2021–2025, which categorized it as a general aviation facility.

Facilities and aircraft 

For the 12-month period ending 19 September 2020, the airport had 700 general aviation aircraft operations, an average of 58 per month: 100% general aviation, 0% air taxi and 0% military. At that time there were 9 aircraft based at this airport, 8 single-engine and 1 multi-engine aircraft.

See also 
 List of airports in South Carolina

References

External links 
 Lee County-Butters Field (52J) at the South Carolina Aeronautics Commission
 

Airports in South Carolina
Transportation in Lee County, South Carolina
Buildings and structures in Lee County, South Carolina